Arthur Plummer (1907 – 17 April 1962) was an English professional football player and manager.

Playing career
He played club football for Bedminster Down Sports, Bristol City, Welton Rovers, Bath City, Coventry City, Boston Town, Walsall, Dundalk, Valenciennes, Albert, Bristol Rovers and Gloucester City.

Coaching career
He managed French team Valenciennes between 1946 and 1947.

References

 

1907 births
1962 deaths
English footballers
Bristol City F.C. players
Welton Rovers F.C. players
Bath City F.C. players
Coventry City F.C. players
Boston Town F.C. players
Walsall F.C. players
Dundalk F.C. players
Valenciennes FC players
Bristol Rovers F.C. players
Gloucester City A.F.C. players
Ligue 1 players
Ligue 2 players
Association football midfielders
English football managers
Valenciennes FC managers
English expatriate footballers
English expatriate football managers
English expatriates in France
Expatriate footballers in France
Expatriate football managers in France